The Virgin Islands competed in the 2015 Parapan American Games.

Competitors
The following table lists Virgin Islands's delegation per sport and gender.

Athletics

Men

References

Nations at the 2015 Parapan American Games
Virgin Islands at the Pan American Games